Map of places in Bridgend County Borough compiled from this list
 See the list of places in Wales for places in other principal areas.

This is a list of places in the Bridgend County Borough, south Wales.

Administrative divisions

Electoral wards

This is a list of electoral wards in Bridgend County Borough, from 1999 to 2022:

Aberkenfig
Bettws
Blackmill
Blaengarw
Brackla
Bryncethin
Bryncoch
Bryntirion, Laleston and Merthyr Mawr
Caerau
Cefn Cribwr
Cefn Glas
Coity
Cornelly
Coychurch Lower
Felindre
Hendre
Litchard
Llangeinor
Llangewydd & Brynhyfryd
Llangynwyd
Maesteg East
Maesteg West
Morfa
Nant-y-Moel
Newcastle
Newton
Nottage
Ogmore Vale
Oldcastle
Pendre
Penprysg
Pen-y-fai
Pontycymer
Porthcawl East Central
Porthcawl West Central
Pyle
Rest Bay
Sarn
Tondu
Ynysawdre

Communities
This is a list of communities:

 Brackla
 Bridgend
 Cefn Cribwr
 Coity Higher
 Cornelly
 Coychurch Higher
 Coychurch Lower
 Garw Valley
 Laleston
 Llangynwyd Lower
 Llangynwyd Middle
 Maesteg
 Merthyr Mawr
 Newcastle Higher
 Ogmore Valley
 Pencoed
 Porthcawl
 Pyle
 St Bride's Minor
 Ynysawdre

Notable places

Principal towns and villages
Settlements with a Town Council:
Bridgend
Maesteg
Pencoed
Porthcawl

Other sizable settlements:
Brackla
Kenfig
Pyle
Cornelly

Archaeological sites
Coity Castle
Newcastle
Ogmore Castle
Kenfig Castle

Geographical

Beaches
Coney Beach
Kenfig Sands
Rest Bay
Sandy Bay, Porthcawl
Trecco Bay

Rivers and waterways
River Ewenny
River Kenfig
Ogmore
Llynfi
Garw River

Retail parks
McArthur Glen Designer Outlet Wales, Sarn, Bridgend
Bridgend Retail Park
Waterton Retail Park

Transport

Major roads
A48 road
M4 motorway

Railway lines
Maesteg Line
South Wales Main Line
Vale of Glamorgan Line

Railway stations
Bridgend railway station
Pencoed railway station
Pyle railway station
Maesteg railway station

References

Bridgend